Ahmadabad (also Romanized as Aḩmadābād and Ahmad Ābād; also known as Gol Tap (Persian: گل تپ), Aḩmadābād-e Gol Tappeh, and Aḩmadābād-e Khāk Tappeh) is a village in Eyvanki Rural District, Eyvanki District, Garmsar County, Semnan Province, Iran. At the 2006 census, its population was 84, in 26 families.

References 

Populated places in Garmsar County